These buildings and structures are illustrated on banknotes of the listed countries.

Afghanistan 
 Blue Mosque, Mazar-i-Sharif
 Ahmed Shah Durrani mausoleum, Kadahar
 Tomb of Mahmud of Ghazni
 Shah Do Shamira Mosque
 Salang Pass
 Paghman Gardens
 Bala Hissar
 Arg (Presidential Palace), Kabul
 Pul e Khishti Mosque
 Arch of Bost
 Khwaja Abdullah Ansari Mosque
 Kandahar International Airport
 Shrine of Ali
 Tomb of Ahmad Shah Durrani Baba

Albania 
 First Albanian Parliament building
 Birthplace of Frashëri
 Vlorë independence building
 Church of Vau
 Amphitheatre at Butrinto (near Saranda)
 Krujë Castle

Algeria 
 Place of the Martyrs, Algiers

Angola 
 Serra da Leba
 Headquarters of the Banco Nacional de Angola
 Luanda

Argentina 
 Museo Mitre
 Monument to the Army of the Andes
 Monument to the National flag of Argentina, Rosario
 Casa Rosada
 Darwin Cemetery, light cruiser General Belgrano, the Falkland Islands
 Ara Pacis

Armenia 
 Yerevan Train Station and statue of David of Sasun
 Urartian cuneiform tablet and a lion relief from the Erebuni fortress
 National Gallery and History Museum of Armenia
 Armenian parliament building
 Mount Ararat and Zvartnots Cathedral
 Armenian Opera Theater
 St. Hripsime Church in Echmiadzin
 Mesrop Mashtots statue and Matenadaran
 Temple of Garni
 Byurakan Observatory
 Government House in Yerevan
 Gyumri
 Etchmiadzin Cathedral

Australia 
 Old Parliament House and New Parliament House

Azerbaijan 
 Palace of the Shirvanshahs
 Maiden Tower

Bahamas 
 Hope Town, Abaco Island

Bahrain 
 Old Bahrain Court
 Bahrain International Circuit
 Al Hedya Al Khalifiya School
 Sail and Pearl monument
 Shaikh Isa House, Muharraq
 Riffa Fort
 Shaikh Isa Bin Salman Al Khalifa Causeway
 Al Fateh Islamic Center

Bangladesh 
 Shahid Minar
 Mehrab
 Baitul Mukarram
 Jatiyo Sangsad Bhaban
 Bagha Mosque
 Jatiyo Smriti Soudho (National Martyrs' Memorial)
 Bangabandhu Bridge (Jamuna Multi-purpose Bridge)
 Curzon Hall
 Headquarters of the Security Printing Corporation
 Bangladesh National Museum

Barbados 
 Morgan Lewis Windmill, St. Andrew
 3Ws Oval cricket facility at the University of the West Indies, Cave Hill Campus
 Charles Duncan O’Neal Bridge over the Careenage, Bridgetown
 Parliament Buildings in Bridgetown
 Independence Square with statue of Errol Barrow in Bridgetown
 Grantley Adams International Airport

Belarus 
 Belaya Vezha, Kamyanyets
 Transfiguration Church, Polatsk
 Rumyantsev-Paskevich Residence, Homyel
 Mir Castle, Mir
 Niasvizh Castle, Nyasvizh
 Regional Museum of Art, Mahilyow
 National Library of Belarus, Minsk
 Victory Square, Minsk
 National Academy of Sciences of Belarus
 Trinity Hill
 Headquarters of the National Bank of the Republic of Belarus
 Kholm Gate
 Brest Fortress Memorial
 Opera and Ballet Theatre (Minsk)
 Republican Trade Unions' Palace of Culture, Minsk
 National Museum of Arts of Belarus, Misnk
 Minsk Sports Palace
 "Raubichy" sports complex
 Trayetskaye Pradmyestsye, Minsk
 Kholm Gate
 Summer amphitheatre, Vitebsk
 Mogilev Maslennikov Art Museum

Belize 
 Maya ruins of Belize (Altun Ha Temple, Xunantunich)
 St. George's Caye, coffin of Thomas Potts
 Government House
 Court House
 St. John's Cathedral
 Central Bank of Belize

Bermuda 
 St. David's Lighthouse
 Camden House
 Dockkyard Clock Tower
 Somerset Bridge
 Commissioner's House
 Gibbs Hill Lighthouse
 St. Mark's Church
 St. Peter's Church
 House of Assembly of Bermuda

Bhutan 
 Simtokha Dzong
 Taktsang
 Paro Rinpung Dzong
 Punakha Dzong
 Trongsa Dzong
 Tashichho Dzong

Denmark 
 Great Belt Fixed Link
 Knippelsbro
 Little Belt Bridge
 Queen Alexandrine Bridge
 Sallingsund Bridge

Eastern Caribbean States 
 Government House, Montserrat
 Brimstone Hill Fortress National Park, view of the twin peaks of Les Pitons Volcano – Petit Piton and Gros Piton near Soufrière in Saint Lucia
 Eastern Caribbean Central Bank headquarters

Falkland Islands 
 Christ Church Cathedral
 Government House

Guernsey 
 Elizabeth College
 Fort Grey

Jersey 
 Elizabeth Castle
 Government House
 La Corbière Lighthouse
 La Hougue Bie
 Le Hocq Tower
 Les Augrès Manor
 Mont Orgueil
 Parish Church of St Helier
 Victoria College

Isle of Man 
 Castle Rushen
 Laxey Wheel
 Peel Castle

Malaysia 
 National Mosque
 Malaysian Houses of Parliament

New Zealand 
 New Zealand Parliament Buildings, including The Beehive
 Porourangi Meeting House

Norway 
 Akershus Fortress
 Borgund Stave Church
 Eidsvollsbygningen
 Haakon's Hall
 Hylestad Stave Church
 Nidaros Cathedral
 Norwegian National Opera
 University of Oslo

Poland
 Rotunda of Saint Nicolas in Cieszyn
 Malbork Castle
 Wawel Castle
 Wilanów Palace

Philippines 
 Barasoain Church
 Malacañang Palace
 National Museum of Fine Arts
 Bangko Sentral ng Pilipinas
 Aguinaldo Shrine

Turkey 
 Anıtkabir
 Atatürk Dam
 Bosphorus Bridge
 Çanakkale Martyrs' Memorial
 Central Bank of the Republic of Turkey
 Dardanelles
 Fountain of Ahmed III
 Grand National Assembly of Turkey
 Hippodrome of Constantinople
 Ishak Pasha Palace
 Istanbul University
 İzmir Clock Tower
 Kızıl Kule
 Maiden's Tower
 Mevlana Museum
 Rumelihisarı
 Samsun
 Selimiye Mosque
 Sivas
 Süleymaniye Mosque
 Ulus, Ankara

Ukraine
 National Bank of Ukraine (building)
 National Opera of Ukraine
 Saint Sophia Cathedral, Kyiv
 Kyiv Pechersk Lavra
 Lviv Theatre of Opera and Ballet
 Teacher's House
 Red University Building
 Lubart's Castle
 National University of Kyiv-Mohyla Academy
 National Academy of Sciences of Ukraine

United States 
 Independence Hall
 Lincoln Memorial
 Treasury Building (Washington, D.C.)
 United States Capitol
 White House

United Kingdom 
 Newgate Prison
 St Paul's Cathedral
 Threadneedle Street
 Worcester Cathedral

Northern Ireland 
 Belfast City Hall
 Dunluce Castle
 Giant's Causeway
 Old Bushmills Distillery
 Port of Belfast
 Queen's University Belfast

Scotland 
 Antonine Wall
 Balmoral Castle
 Brig o' Doon
 Brodick Castle
 Culzean Castle
 Edinburgh Castle
 Edinburgh International Conference Centre
 Falkirk Wheel
 Forth Bridge
 Glamis Castle
 University of Glasgow
 Glenfinnan Viaduct
 Heart of Neolithic Orkney
 Holmwood House
 Inverness Castle
 Kessock Bridge
 The Lighthouse, Glasgow
 New Lanark
 New Town, Edinburgh
 Old Town, Edinburgh
 Stirling Castle

Zimbabwe
 Balancing Rocks
 National Heroes Acre (Zimbabwe)
 Kariba Dam
Banknotes
Buildings
Banknotes